Diocese of Embu may refer to:

 one of the Anglican dioceses of Mount Kenya
 Roman Catholic Diocese of Embu